Karl Sohn:
 Karl Ferdinand Sohn (1805-1867) was a German painter of the Düsseldorf school of painting.
 Karl Rudolf Sohn (1845-1908) was his son; also a German painter.

See also 
 Sohn